This article lists potential candidates for the Democratic nomination for Vice President of the United States in the 2016 election. Former Secretary of State Hillary Clinton, the 2016 Democratic nominee for President of the United States, chose Senator Tim Kaine of Virginia as her running mate. The formal nomination took place at the 2016 Democratic National Convention. The Clinton–Kaine ticket lost the 2016 presidential election to the Republican Trump–Pence ticket, and Kaine returned to the Senate following the campaign.

Selection process
By April 2016, Clinton had begun discussions with advisers and allies regarding her potential running mate, though Bernie Sanders continued to challenge her in the Democratic primaries. According to campaign sources, Clinton did not have a particular running mate in mind, and did not feel pressured to pick a running mate designed specifically to appeal to Sanders supporters. Clinton's low public approval ratings led many of her allies to recommend that she choose a running mate with the potential to inspire voters, but Clinton's campaign expressed confidence that her ratings would improve once the Republicans had selected a candidate. There was relatively little public discussion about Sanders's running mate selection process. As the 2016 Republican National Convention took place roughly one week before the July 25–28 Democratic National Convention, the Democratic presidential nominee was set to choose her running mate after the Republicans nominated their ticket of Donald Trump and Mike Pence. Clinton's running mate selection process was led by campaign chairman John Podesta and Cheryl Mills, while the vetting process was led by attorney James Hamilton. In discussing her potential vice presidential choice, Clinton stated that the most important attribute she was looking for is the ability and experience to immediately step into the role of president. In contrast to previous Democratic presidential nominees, Clinton allowed for a relatively open selection process, holding rallies with many potential running mates and placing little emphasis on keeping her short list confidential.

Announcement 
On July 22, Clinton announced via Twitter that she had chosen Tim Kaine as her running mate. After the selection, Amy Chozick of The New York Times described Kaine as a "battleground state politician with working-class roots and a fluency in Spanish." Like his Republican counterpart, Mike Pence, Kaine has experience both as a governor and a member of Congress.

If the Clinton-Kaine ticket had won election, Kaine would have resigned from the Senate, with Democratic Governor Terry McAuliffe appointing Kaine's replacement prior to a 2017 special election. According to journalist Glenn Thrush, Kaine had been the preferred choice of Clinton since at least February 2016.

Reported shortlist 
The Wall Street Journal reported on June 16, 2016 that Clinton's shortlist included the following nine individuals.

According to a CNN report published on June 21, 2016, Clinton had narrowed down her list to no more than five contenders, including Kaine, Warren, and Castro. However, a separate report in The Washington Post released that same day stated that, while Clinton had begun vetting Kaine, Warren, and Castro, more than a dozen people remained on her list of possible running mates. On July 7, 2016, CNN reported that Clinton had narrowed down her shortlist to five people: Brown, Kaine, Perez, Warren, and Secretary of Agriculture Tom Vilsack. On July 12, 2016, The New York Times confirmed that the Clinton campaign was vetting former NATO Supreme Allied Commander Europe, Retired Admiral James G. Stavridis. Clinton also met with Colorado Governor John Hickenlooper in mid-July, fueling speculation that he might be chosen as the vice presidential nominee. After Republican presidential nominee Donald Trump named Mike Pence as his running mate on July 15, Kaine and Vilsack emerged as the top two contenders, although other individuals such as Perez remained in contention.

WikiLeaks List
On October 18, 2016 WikiLeaks released more hacked emails from Clinton Campaign Chair John Podesta. One of these emails Podesta sent Clinton was a "first cut of people to consider for VP" in March 2016. He wrote that this list had been generated with other top aides. Podesta organized the list of 39 contenders into what he called "food groups" apparently based around identities — Latinos, women, African-Americans, military brass, and business leaders.

Other speculated candidates
The following individuals received coverage as potential running mates from multiple news sources. These individuals do not appear on the short list above or on the Wikileaks list.

Cabinet members

Members of Congress

Governors

Other individual

See also
Hillary Clinton 2016 presidential campaign
2016 Democratic Party presidential candidates
2016 Democratic Party presidential primaries
2016 Democratic National Convention
2016 United States presidential election
List of United States major party presidential tickets

Notes

References

2016 United States presidential campaigns
Vice presidency of the United States
Democratic Party (United States) campaigns
Tim Kaine
Hillary Clinton
Joe Biden
Evan Bayh
Bernie Sanders
Cory Booker
Julian Castro
Elizabeth Warren
Eric Garcetti
John Hickenlooper
Kirsten Gillibrand
Amy Klobuchar
Michael Bennet
Bill Gates
Michael Bloomberg
Martin O'Malley
Kamala Harris